Emanuele Bardelloni (born 15 May 1990) is an Italian footballer who plays as a forward for AC Trento.

Career
Born in Brescia, Lombardy, Bardelloni started his career at Brescia Calcio. In 2010 Bardelloni joined Calcio Como in temporary deal. On 31 August 2011 Como signed half of the registration rights of Bardelloni, with Davide Ferrari returned to Brescia outright. In June 2012 Brescia gave up the remain registration rights to Como. On 31 August 2012 Bardelloni joined Venezia in 1-year deal. On 30 January 2013 Bardelloni joined Andria, with Andrea Menegon moved to opposite direction.

In mid-2013 Bardelloni joined Lega Pro Seconda Divisione club Pergolettese. On 24 January 2014 his contract was extended to 30 June 2015.

References

External links
 AIC profile (data by football.it) 
 

1990 births
Footballers from Brescia
Living people
Italian footballers
Italy youth international footballers
Association football forwards
Brescia Calcio players
Como 1907 players
Venezia F.C. players
S.S. Fidelis Andria 1928 players
U.S. Pergolettese 1932 players
Santarcangelo Calcio players
Forlì F.C. players
Serie C players
Serie D players